Banchia-ye Sofla (also Romanized as Bānchīā-ye Soflá; also known as Bānchīā-ye ‘Olyā and Tāzehābād-e Bānchīā) is a village in Dowlatabad Rural District, in the Central District of Ravansar County, Kermanshah Province, Iran. At the 2006 census, its population was 19, in 5 families.

References 

Populated places in Ravansar County